The Musée Crozatier is a museum in Le Puy-en-Velay in the French Auvergne. Inaugurated in 1868, its collection comprises art and archaeological artifacts from Velay and the Haute-Loire region. The museum has undergone a major renovation from 2010 to 2018 (re opening in July 2018).

Collection 
The diversity of the museum's collections (painting, sculpture, graphic arts, works of art, archaeology, natural history, mechanics, crafts, lace) allows a discovery of the history of Velay and an overview of art and sciences, through 4 galleries: historical, fine arts, scientific and local crafts.

See also 
 List of museums in France

References

External links 

 Musée Crozatier 

Museums in Haute-Loire
Art museums established in 1868
Local museums in France
1868 establishments in France